Galih Ginanjar (born in Garut, West Java, Indonesia) is an Indonesian actor. He played Rasya in the soap opera Cinderella (Apakah Cinta Hanyalah Mimpi?).

Personal life
On March 5, 2011 Ginanjar married Fairuz A Rafiq. On 2 April 2012, Ginanjar had a child named King Faaz Arafiq. Ginanjar married Barbie Kumalasari in 2015.

Filmography

TV series
 Cinderella (Apakah Cinta Hanyalah Mimpi?) (2007)
 Bunga (2007)
 Kasih dan Amara (2008-2009)
 Pelangi
 Hafizah (2009)
 ''Tangan-Tangan Mungil (2013)

References

1988 births
Living people
Indonesian male film actors